Yugo is a subcompact vehicle built by Zastava Automobiles.

It may also refer to:
Yugo (given name), a masculine Japanese given name
Yugo, Baltistan, a small village in the disputed Jammu and Kashmir region
Yugo Amaryl, a fictional character in Isaac Asimov's Foundation series
Yugo (manga), 1994–2004 manga series
King Yugo, the main character of the Wakfu (TV series)
Yugo class submarine, midget submarines used by North Korea

See also
Yugo-nostalgia, a cultural phenomenon occurring among some citizens of the former Socialist Federal Republic of Yugoslavia
Yugo-Zapadnaya, the southwestern terminus of the Sokolnicheskaya Line of the Moscow Metro